is a Japanese voice actress affiliated with Mausu Promotion.

Biography
She joined the talent agency Yu-rin Pro in 2013, and later moved to Mausu Promotion in 2018. 

Sugiyama starred in her first lead role as Tanis in the 2018 anime series Creatures Family Days. In 2020, she voiced Minare Koda in the anime series Wave, Listen to Me!, for which she was nominated for Best VA Performance (JP) at the 5th Crunchyroll Anime Awards. In 2021, Sugiyama was one of the recipients of the Best New Actress Award at the 15th Seiyu Awards.

Filmography

Television animation
2017
 Kenka Bancho Otome: Girl Beats Boys as Tadashi Konparu
 Atom: The Beginning as Urara Suidobashi

2018
 Creatures Family Days as Tanis
 Kakuriyo: Bed and Breakfast for Spirits as Ranmaru (childhood)
 FLCL Progressive as Yuya
 Conception as Tarua
 Ulysses: Jeanne d'Arc and the Alchemist Knight as Miriam

2019
 My Roommate Is a Cat as Subaru (childhood)
 Boogiepop and Others as Shizuka Hashizaka
 JoJo's Bizarre Adventure: Golden Wind as Anita
 No Guns Life as Imelda

2020
 Aikatsu on Parade! as Kotomi Kojima
 Wave, Listen to Me! as Minare Koda
 Tsugu Tsugumomo as Arumi Ashimine
 Cardfight!! Vanguard Gaiden if as Masked Magician Harri

2021
 Cardfight!! Vanguard overDress as TV Announcer
 86 as Henrietta Penrose
 I've Been Killing Slimes for 300 Years and Maxed Out My Level as Rosalie
 Tropical-Rouge! Pretty Cure as Izumi Komori
 Takt Op. Destiny as Jimmy
 The Vampire Dies in No Time as Shadow, Twink Hunters

2022
 Requiem of the Rose King as Buckingham (first cour)
 GaruGaku II: Lucky Stars as Chino Hamura
 On Air Dekinai! as Yori-chan
 3-byo Ato, Yajū.: Gōkon de Suma ni Ita Kare wa Midara na Nikushoku Deshita as Tsumugi Kume (on-air version)
 Vermeil in Gold as Jessica Schwartz

2023
 Reign of the Seven Spellblades as Pete Reston

Original net animation
2018
 Lost Song as Alond

2020
 Ghost in the Shell: SAC_2045 as Opeko
 Zetsumetsu Kigu-shun as Rakko-shun

2023
 Junji Ito Maniac: Japanese Tales of the Macabre as Kazuko Morinaka

Original video animation
2021
 Planetarian: Snow Globe as Mother

Video games
2014
 Great Edo Blacksmith as Ranmaru 

2015
 Yōkai Hyakkitan! as Kidōmaru, Makura-gaeshi 

2016
 Uchi no Hime-sama ga Ichiban Kawaii as Hera
 Kansen × Shōjo as Hotaru Kirishima

2018
 Kuro no Kishidan: Knights Chronicle as Abel 

2019
 Kamihime Kakusei Melty Maiden as Sara 
 Conception Plus: Ore no Kodomo o Undekure! as Tarua
 Utawarerumono: Lost Flag as Unkei
 Pokémon Masters EX as Anzu/Janine

2020
 Saint Seiya: Rising Cosmo as Cassiopeia Bilda
 World Flipper as Nicola

2021
 Samurai Force: Shing! as Aiko 
 Monster Hunter Rise as Monju

2022
 Star Melody: Yumemi Dreamer as Envy Rose
 Final Fantasy XIV as Azeyma
 Azur Lane as SMS Thüringen
 AI: The Somnium Files – Nirvana Initiative as Hanayo Nasu

Dubbing
King Richard as Venus Williams (Saniyya Sidney)
Last Night in Soho as Jocasta (Synnøve Karlsen)
Mare of Easttown as Siobhan Sheehan (Angourie Rice)
Till Death as Emma (Megan Fox)
Uncharted as Zoe (Alana Boden)

References

External links
 Official agency profile 
 

Japanese video game actresses
Japanese voice actresses
Living people
Mausu Promotion voice actors
Seiyu Award winners
Voice actresses from Hokkaido
Year of birth missing (living people)